The 2015 PLDT Home Ultera PSL All-Filipino was the first conference of the Philippine Super Liga for its third season. The conference began on March 21, 2015 at the Mall of Asia Arena and ended on May 14, 2015 at the Cuneta Astrodome.

There was no tournament for the men's division.

In the women's division, the former Generika Lifesavers became Shopinas.com Lady Clickers, the original Mane 'n Tail Lady Stallions were renamed Philips Gold Lady Slammers and a new team assumed the Mane 'n Tail name, while RC Cola did not participate. The Petron Blaze Spikers became the first team to sweep a PSL tournament with a 13–0 record and claim the All-Filipino championship, its second consecutive PSL title.

Women's division

Classification round

|}

 

|}

Playoffs

Quarterfinals

|}

Semi-finals

|}

5th place

|}

3rd place

|}

Women’s Finals

|}

Final standing

Awards

Individual Awards

Skill set leaders

Venues
Cuneta Astrodome (main venue)
Mall of Asia Arena (March 21 - opening day)
Filoil Flying V Arena (March 29 and March 30)
Alonte Sports Arena ("Spike on Tour" / March 26, April 9 and April 18)
Quezon Convention Center ("Spike on Tour" / April 25)
Imus Sports Complex ("Spike on Tour" / May 11 / Finals Game 1)

Broadcast partners
 AksyonTV, Sports5.ph 
 Solar Sports

References

Philippine Super Liga
PSL
PSL